CMX was an imprint of DC Comics, a division of Warner Bros. Entertainment. It was DC's line of manga translations.  CMX was known for its censored release of Tenjho Tenge and the print version of Fred Gallagher's Megatokyo web manga series.

Controversy
One of CMX's initial launches was a title variously known as Tenjo Tenge, Tenjho Tenge, and Ten Ten. When CMX released Tenjho Tenge, many fans were livid that title had been edited contentwise and changed graphically to appeal to a "larger demographic"—in other words, edited to be acceptable to bookstores without shrinkwrap. Tenjho Tenge and CMX received a heavy amount of angry backlash for the edits.

CMX's announcement that all changes had been overseen and specifically approved by Oh! Great, the manga artist, did nothing to appease the vocal fans who did not want the work censored. Some readers suggested a boycott of all CMX titles.

In the face of complaints, CMX had internal discussions about the possibility of publishing an unedited version of Tenjho Tenge, but decided to complete the current version. At the 2007 Anime Expo, CMX stated about changing Tenjho Tenge'''s rating to Mature beginning with volume fifteen, but warned that it still would be edited, but more lightly.

DC Comics released a statement in May 2010 about its intention to shut the CMX brand down, with no new titles being published after July 1, 2010. At the time of its statement, DC could not state what would happen to all current unfinished volumes affected by the July 1 shutdown date. Megatokyo however continued under the DC Comics imprint.Megatokyo by 2013 returned to Dark Horse Comics and Tenjho Tenge went to Viz Media.

List of manga titles published by CMX
 by 
 Crayon Shin-chan by Yoshito Usui
 Canon by 
 Chikyu Misaki by Iwahara Yuji
 Cipher by Minako Narita
 Classical Medley by Sanae Kana
 Densha Otoko - The Story of the Train Man Who Fell in Love With A Girl by Hitori Nakano (original creator) and Wataru Watanabe (art)
 The Devil Does Exist (Akuma de Sōrō) by Mitsuba Takanashi
 Dorothea (Dorothea - Majyo no Tettsui) by Cuvie
 Emma by Kaoru Mori
 The Empty Empire (Kara no Teikoku) by Naoe Kita
 From Eroica with Love (Eroica yori Ai wo Komete) by Yasuko Aoike
 Gals! by Mihona Fujii
 Go Go Heaven!! by Keiko Yamada
 Gon by Masashi Tanaka
 I Hate You More Than Anyone (Sekai de Ichiban Daikirai) by Banri Hidaka
 Key to the Kingdom (Ohoku no Kagi) by Kyōko Shitō
 Kikaider Code 02 by Shotaro Ishinomori (original creator) and Meimu (story and art)
 King of Cards (Card no Ō-sama) by Makoto Tetano
 Land of the Blindfolded (Mekakushi no Kuni) by Sakura Tsukuba
 Leader's High! by Arashi Shindoh
 Love for Venus (Venus wa Kataomoi) by Yuki Nakaji
 Madara (full title: Mōryō Senki Madara) by Eiji Otsuka (story) and Shōu Tajima (art)
 Moon Child (Tsuki no Ko) by Reiko Shimizu
 Megatokyo (from Volume 4) by Fred Gallagher
 Monster Collection (full title: Monster Collection Majūtsukai no Shōjo) by Hitoshi Yasuda (original creator) and Sei Itoh (story and art)
 Musashi Number Nine (Kyūbanme no Musashi) by Miyuki Takanashi
 My Darling Miss Bancho (Ah! Itoshi no Banchousama) by Mayu Fujikata 
 The Name of the Flower (Hana no Namae) by Ken Saitou
 Omukae desu by Meca Tanaka
 Orfina (Manga) by Kitsune Tennōji
 Oyayubi-hime Infinity by Toru Fujieda
 Palette of 12 Secret Colors by Nari Kusakawa
 Penguin Revolution (Penguin Kakumei) by Sakura Tsukuba
 Phantom Thief Jeanne by Arina Tanemura (Re-licensed by Viz Media)
 Pieces of a Spiral (Rasen no Kakera) by Tachibana Kaimu
 Presents by Kanako Inuki
 The Recipe for Gertrude (Gertrude no Recipe) by Nari Kusakawa
 Seimaden by Yō Higuri
 Steel Fist Riku by Jyutaroh Nishino
 Stolen Hearts by Miku Sakamoto
 Swan by Kyoko Ariyoshi
 Sword of the Dark Ones (also Ragnarok) by Kentaro Yasui (story) and Tsukasa Kotobuki (art)
 Tears of a Lamb (Hitsuji no Namida) by Banri Hidaka
 Tenjho Tenge by Oh! great (Re-licensed by Viz Media)
 TenRyu: The Dragon Cycle by Sanami Matoh
 Testarotho by Kei Sanbe
 Time Guardian by Daimuro Kishi (story) and Tamao Ichinose (art)
 Tower of the Future (Mirai no Utena) by Saki Hiwatari
 Two Flowers of the Dragon (Ryū no Hana Wazurai) by Nari Kusakawa
 Variante by Igura Sugimoto
 Venus Capriccio by Mai Nishikata
 VS (Versus) by Keiko Yamada
 The Young Magician'' by Yuri Narushima

References

External links

 

 
Defunct comics and manga publishing companies
DC Comics imprints